Pieter Serry (born 21 November 1988) is a professional Belgian road cyclist, who currently rides for UCI WorldTeam .

Major results

2010
 4th Overall Cinturó de l'Empordà
 5th Overall Tour des Pyrénées
2011
 2nd De Vlaamse Pijl
 9th Overall Bayern–Rundfahrt
1st  Mountains classification
 9th Kattekoers
2012
 1st  Young rider classification, Tour of Belgium
 3rd Brabantse Pijl
 4th Volta Limburg Classic
 6th Overall Tour of Norway
 7th Grand Prix de la Somme
 9th Grand Prix d'Ouverture La Marseillaise
2013
 7th Giro di Lombardia
 8th Clásica de San Sebastián
2014
 3rd  Team time trial, UCI Road World Championships
 3rd Time trial, National Road Championships
 6th Trofeo Serra de Tramuntana
 10th Classic Sud-Ardèche
2015
 4th Overall Czech Cycling Tour
1st Stage 1 (TTT)
 7th Classic Sud-Ardèche
2016
 4th Overall Tour La Provence
 4th Classic Sud-Ardèche
 5th La Drôme Classic
2017
 9th Bruges Cycling Classic
 10th Overall Vuelta a San Juan
2018
 3rd Overall Tour de Wallonie
 4th Road race, National Road Championships
 4th Brabantse Pijl
 5th Vuelta a Murcia
 9th La Drôme Classic
 9th Strade Bianche
2019
 5th Le Samyn
 9th Brabantse Pijl
2020
 1st Stage 1b (TTT) Settimana Internazionale di Coppi e Bartali
 3rd Road race, National Road Championships
2023
 1st Stage 2 (TTT) UAE Tour

Grand Tour general classification results timeline

References

External links

Pieter Serry's profile at Cycling Base

1988 births
Living people
Belgian male cyclists
People from Aalter
Cyclists from East Flanders